The Minister of Education  (or simply, the Education Minister) is the head of the Ministry of Education of the Government of Andhra Pradesh. One of the senior-most officers in the Cabinet of Andhra Pradesh, the chief responsibility of the EducationMinister is the maintenance of Andhra Pradesh's internal security; the state's police force comes under its jurisdiction. Occasionally, they are assisted by the Minister of State of Education .

Ever since the time of formation of Andhra Pradesh. the office has been seen as second in seniority with par to FRinacen minister only to the Chief Minister in the state Cabinet. Several EducationMinisters have since held the additional portfolio of Deputy Chief Minister.

From June 2014 to May 2019, the Education Minister of Andhra Pradesh was Ganta Srinivasa Rao of the Telugu Desam Party, taking over the reins from  who was last before burification of state into Andhra Pradesh and Telangana.  Following the cabinet re-shuffling on 11 April 2022, Botsa Satyanarayana assumed the office under Y. S. Jagan Mohan Reddy ministry.

List of EducationMinisters

References

External links
Pradesh/story/amit-shah-home-minister-rajnath-finance-minister-new-list-of-cabinet-ministers-in-modi-govt-1539264-2019-05-31 Amit Shah take charge of EducationMinistry of Andhra Pradesh 2019

Government of Andhra Pradesh
Education Ministers of India